Senator Dickson may refer to:

David Catchings Dickson (1818–1880), Texas State Senate
James Hill Dickson (1863–1938), Northern Irish Senate
Joseph Dickson (1745–1825), North Carolina State Senate
Margaret H. Dickson (fl. 2000s–2010s), North Carolina State Senate

See also
Senator Dixon (disambiguation)